ISO 3166-2:TW is the entry for Taiwan, "Taiwan, Province of China", or "Taiwan (Province of China)", in ISO 3166-2, part of the ISO 3166 standard published by the International Organization for Standardization (ISO), which defines codes for the names of the principal subdivisions (e.g., provinces or states) of all countries coded in ISO 3166-1.

ISO 3166-2:TW defines codes for the subdivisions of Taiwan located on the islands of Taiwan (Formosa), Penghu (Pescadores), Kinmen, Matsu (Lienchiang), and their subsidiary islands. These areas are de facto under the administration of the government of the Republic of China which resides in Taipei. The government of the People's Republic of China, which resides in Beijing, also claims these islands but considers ROC-held Fujian islands of Kinmen and Matsu to be within its Fujian Province, not its nominal Taiwan Province.

Currently ISO 3166-2:TW lists 13 counties, 3 cities, and 6 special municipalities. Constitutionally the counties and cities are part of the ROC provinces of Taiwan and Fujian, but since the provincial governments were largely streamlined in 1998 these 22 subdivisions are regarded as the principal subdivisions of Republic of China (Taiwan).

Format 
 Each code consists of two parts, separated by a hyphen. The second part is three letters.
 The divisions in the list are categorized in three types: 
 Cities: Romanized as shih and formerly called "municipalities" in ISO 3166-2. The divisions carry City in their official names.
 Counties: Romanized as hsien and formerly called "districts" in ISO 3166-2. The divisions carry County in their official names.
 Special municipalities: Romanized as chih-hsia-shih. The divisions also carry City in their official names.
 Taiwan is currently assigned the ISO 3166-2 code  under ISO 3166-2:CN, as China solely claims it as a province of China.

Current codes
Subdivision names are listed as in the ISO 3166-2 standard published by the ISO 3166 Maintenance Agency (ISO 3166/MA).

Changes
The following changes to the entry have been announced by the ISO 3166/MA since the first publication of ISO 3166-2 in 1998.  ISO stopped issuing newsletters in 2013.

See also
 Administrative divisions of Taiwan
 FIPS region codes of Taiwan
 Taiwan, China#Taiwanese reactions

References

External links
 ISO Online Browsing Platform: TW
 Counties of Taiwan, Statoids.com

2:TW
 ISO 3166-2
Taiwan geography-related lists